Elijah Tsatas (born 18 October 2004 is an Australian footballer who plays for Essendon Football Club in the Australian Football League (AFL). He was selected as the fifth pick in the 2022 AFL Draft. Essendon rejected several lucrative offers in favour of selecting Tsatas. Tsatas is friends with fellow 2022 draftee George Wardlaw, with whom he has played football since he was a child. Prior to selection, Tsatas suffered a serious foot injury that prevented him from playing for three months. He eventually recovered in time to score well in games before being interviewed for the draft. Tsatas is a midfielder-wingman who is described as a player who "can run and carry, has a knack of finding space at stoppages, and has excellent disposal".

References

Living people
2004 births
Sandringham Dragons players